Hacallı (also, Ha-callı and Gadzhally) is a village in the Tartar Rayon of Azerbaijan.  The village forms part of the municipality of İrəvanlı.

References 

Populated places in Tartar District